Los Problemas de papá is a 1954 Argentine comedy film directed by Kurt Land.

Plot 
A couple sees their lives altered when they take care of their grandchildren while their children go on a trip.

Cast 

 Enrique Muiño
 Amalia Sánchez Ariño
 Alberto Berco
 Hilda Rey
 Alberto Anchart
 Oscar Moyano
 Menchu Quesada
 Fernando Siro
 Egle Martin
 Víctor Martucci
 Mar Lácar
 Delfy Miranda
 Osvaldo Domecq
 Aída Villadeamigo
 Juan Alighieri
 Osvaldo Terranova
 Cayetano Biondo
 Santiago Rebull

External links
 
 

1954 films
1950s Spanish-language films
Argentine black-and-white films
Argentine comedy films
1954 comedy films
1950s Argentine films